Everett Marcell (September 1, 1916 – October 10, 1990), nicknamed "Ziggy", was an American Negro league catcher and Harlem Globetrotters basketball player in the 1930s and 1940s.

A native of New Orleans, Louisiana, Marcell attended Southern University, and was the son of fellow Negro leaguer Oliver Marcell. A basketball star at Southern, Marcell was known for his extraordinary ball-handling skills. He continued his basketball career after college, suiting up for the Harlem Globetrotters from 1938 to 1946, and for the Los Angeles Red Devils basketball team alongside Baseball Hall of Famer Jackie Robinson in 1946. Marcell also played professional football in 1944 for the Los Angeles Bulldogs.

Marcell made his Negro leagues debut in 1939 for the Kansas City Monarchs, and played for several teams before concluding his Negro leagues career with the Newark Eagles in 1948. In 1950, he played for the Farnham Pirates of the Provincial League.

Marcell died in Los Angeles, California in 1990 at age 74.

References

External links
 and Seamheads
 Everett Marcell at Negro League Baseball Players Association

1916 births
1990 deaths
Baltimore Elite Giants players
Chicago American Giants players
Homestead Grays players
Kansas City Monarchs players
New York Black Yankees players
Newark Eagles players
Philadelphia Stars players
Los Angeles White Sox players
20th-century African-American sportspeople
Baseball catchers